The Westminster Archives Centre is the archive centre for the City of Westminster, London, located at 10 St Ann's Street, London SW1P 2DE England.

Local archives

Archives and library sources are available free of charge for the City of Westminster, covering Marylebone, Paddington and Westminster.

 Building History including texts for architecture and building historians 
 London Theatre History 
 Family History
 Poor Law references about the history of charity, poverty, and welfare in London

Visitors

Visitors must be members of Westminster Libraries and Archives in order to visit the City of Westminster Archives Centre. Membership is free, and visitors can join when they visit.

See also
 National Archives
 The National Archives (United Kingdom)

References

External links
Westminster Archives Centre

Westminster
Archives in the City of Westminster